"" is the ninth single by Japanese singer Angela Aki and was released on September 16, 2009, one year after her previous single's release. The single contains the song "It's So Hard to Say Goodbye to Yesterday", which is a cover of song by American singer G. C. Cameron by the same title. "Ai no Kisetsu" was used as a theme song for NHK drama, Tsubasa.

Track listing

Charts

External links 
 Official Discography 

2009 singles
Angela Aki songs
Japanese-language songs
2009 songs
Songs written by Angela Aki